Mike or Michael McKay may refer to:

 Michael McKay (cyclist) (born 1964), Jamaican cyclist who represented Jamaica at the 1992 Summer Olympics
 Michael McKay (labor leader), American labor leader and racketeer
 Michael McKay (astronaut), former member of the Canadian Astronaut Corps
 Mike McKay (basketball) (born 1965), Australian basketball player
 Mike McKay (ice hockey) (born 1976), Canadian ice hockey player
 Mike McKay (rower) (born 1964), Australian rower and Olympic medalist
 Mike McKay (politician) (born 1969), member of the Maryland House of Delegates

See also
 Michael Mackay (born 1982), footballer
 Mickey MacKay (1894–1940), Canadian ice hockey player